The 2012 AAA Texas 500 was a NASCAR Sprint Cup Series stock car race held on November 4, 2012, at Texas Motor Speedway in  Fort Worth, Texas. Contested over 334 laps on the 1.5-mile (2.4 km) asphalt quad-oval, it was the 34th race of the 2012 Sprint Cup Series season, as well as the 8th race in the ten-race Chase for the Sprint Cup, which ends the season. Jimmie Johnson of Hendrick Motorsports won the race, his 5th win of the season. Brad Keselowski finished second, and Kyle Busch third.

Report

Background

Texas Motor Speedway is one of ten intermediate tracks to hold NASCAR races; the others are Atlanta Motor Speedway, Kansas Speedway, Chicagoland Speedway, Darlington Raceway, Homestead Miami Speedway, New Hampshire Motor Speedway, Kentucky Speedway, Las Vegas Motor Speedway, and Charlotte Motor Speedway. The track's turns are banked at 24 degrees, while the front stretch, the location of the finish line, is five degrees. The back stretch, opposite of the front, also has a five degree banking. The racetrack has seats for 191,122 spectators.

Before the race, Jimmie Johnson led the Drivers' Championship with 2,291 points, and Brad Keselowski stood in 2nd with 2,289 points. Clint Bowyer followed in 3rd with 2,265 points, three points ahead of Kasey Kahne and 23 ahead of Denny Hamlin in 4th and 5th. Jeff Gordon with 2,237 was nine points ahead of Martin Truex Jr., as Matt Kenseth with 2,226 points, was four points ahead of Greg Biffle and six ahead of Tony Stewart. Kevin Harvick and Dale Earnhardt Jr. was 11th and 12th with 2,203 and 2,151 points, respectively.

In the Manufacturers' Championship, Chevrolet was leading with 222 points, 25 points ahead of Toyota. Ford, with 164 points, was 21 points ahead of Dodge in the battle for 3rd. Stewart is the defending race winner after winning the event in 2011.

Entry list

Practice and qualifying

Three practice sessions are scheduled to be held before the race; the first on Friday, which lasted 90 minutes. The second and third are both scheduled on Saturday afternoon with the first being 50 minutes long, while the second is scheduled for 60. Truex Jr. was quickest with a time of 28.310 seconds in the first session, 0.044 seconds faster than Mark Martin. Keselowski was just off Martin's pace, followed by Bowyer, Stewart, and Aric Almirola. Kenseth was 7th, still within a half of a second of Truex's time.

46 cars were entered for qualifying, but only 43 could qualify for the race because of NASCAR's qualifying procedure. Johnson clinched the 29th pole position of his career and 4th of the season, with a time of 28.261 seconds. He was joined on the front row of the grid by Biffle. Kyle Busch qualified third, Bowyer took 4th, and Truex Jr. started 5th. Joey Logano, Trevor Bayne, Keselowski, Carl Edwards and Kenseth rounded out the top ten The three drivers that failed to qualify for the race were Stephen Leicht, Kelly Bires, and David Stremme.

In the second practice session, Keselowski was fastest with a time of 28.888 seconds, 100th of a second quicker than second-placed Johnson. Hamlin took third place, ahead of Biffle, Edwards and Bowyer. Kyle Busch only managed 7th place, while Stewart was only quick enough for 8th position. In the third and final practice, Keselowski remained quickest with a time of 29.300 seconds. Bowyer followed in second, ahead of Kenseth and Johnson. Edwards was 5th quickest, with a time of 29.375 seconds. Hamlin, Sam Hornish Jr., Kyle Busch, A. J. Allmendinger, and Earnhardt Jr. rounded out the first ten positions.

Results

Qualifying

Race results

Standings after the race

Drivers' Championship standings

Manufacturers' Championship standings

Note: Only the first twelve positions are included for the driver standings.

References

NASCAR races at Texas Motor Speedway
AAA Texas 500
AAA Texas 500
2010s in Fort Worth, Texas
AAA Texas 500